Charlie Hofheimer (born April 17, 1981) is an  American film, television, and theater actor. He landed his first film role as Jim Garland in the 1994 version of Lassie. He is known for his role as Abe Drexler on Mad Men. He has also made many TV guest appearances in a number of TV series.

Life and career
Hofheimer was born in Detroit, Michigan and moved to Brooklyn, New York at the age of one. He began acting at a young age.  His first film role was in the 1994 version of Lassie. He has appeared in other feature films such as Boys, Fathers' Day, Music of the Heart, Black Hawk Down and The Village. In 2008 Hofheimer produced, directed, wrote and edited a short film, Baggage.

Hofheimer's television credits include Are You Afraid of the Dark?, Law & Order, CSI: Crime Scene Investigation, NCIS, Numb3rs, Medium, House M.D., and Mad Men.

Hofheimer has also starred in several theatre productions. In 1996 he played Kenny Simmonds in Minor Demons at the Currican Theatre in New York City, and then again in 1997 at the Century Theatre in New York City. In 2000 he played Ovid Bernstein and Tobias Pfeiffer II in Old Money at the Mitzi E. Newhouse Theater in New York City. His other stage performances include Spittin' Image (as Matt) at the Forum Theatre, Ruler of my Destiny (as Hart) at the Long Wharf Theatre in New Haven, Connecticut, Opelika (as Matty) at the Third Eye Repertory Company in New York City, Treasure Island (as Jim Hawkins) at the Blue Light Theatre Company in New York City and he made his Broadway debut as Jimmy in On the Waterfront.

In 1999, he graduated from New York Lab School, a small public school in New York City.

Filmography

References

External links

Charlie Hofheimer at flixster

1981 births
American male film actors
Living people